Lyndale is a neighborhood within the Powderhorn community in south Minneapolis, Minnesota, United States. Its boundaries are Lake Street to the north, Interstate 35W to the east, 36th Street to the south and Lyndale Avenue South to the west.

The neighborhood is separated from most of the rest of the Powderhorn community by Interstate 35W.

Schools 
 Lyndale Community School (K-5), 312 West 34th Street, Minneapolis, MN 55408.

References

External links 
 Minneapolis Neighborhood Profile - Lyndale
 Lyndale Neighborhood Association
 Lyndale Community School
 Families Building Community
 Southwest Minneapolis Business Directory (NEHBA sponsored)

Neighborhoods in Minneapolis